The Embassy of Cyprus in Moscow is the chief diplomatic mission of Cyprus in the Russian Federation. It is located at 9 Povarskaya Street in the Arbat district of Moscow

See also 
 Cyprus–Russia relations
 Diplomatic missions in Russia

References

External links 
  Embassy of Cyprus in Moscow

Cyprus–Russia relations
Cyprus
Moscow
Arbat District
Cultural heritage monuments of regional significance in Moscow